The 2003 Nigerian Senate election in Zamfara State was held on April 12, 2003, to elect members of the Nigerian Senate to represent Zamfara State. Lawali Shuaibu representing Zamfara North, Saidu Dansadan representing Zamfara Central and Yushau Anka representing Zamfara West all won on the platform of the All Nigeria Peoples Party.

Overview

Summary

Results

Zamfara North 
The election was won by Lawali Shuaibu of the All Nigeria Peoples Party.

Zamfara Central 
The election was won by Saidu Dansadan of the All Nigeria Peoples Party.

Zamfara West 
The election was won by Yushau Anka of the All Nigeria Peoples Party.

References 

April 2003 events in Nigeria
Zamfara State Senate elections
Zam